Jump is the first album of the girlband Djumbo. It was released on 9 May 2005.

Track listing
 Hide & Seek (Pak Me Dan)
 Call Me
 Made To Love You
 Going Up
 Get Out
 Bye Bye Bye
 Know My Name
 Eyahe (Ik Wil Met Jou)
 On My Own
 Time Out
 The Djumbo Jump
 Lullaby
 Hide & Seek (Catch Us If You Can)
 Eyahe (Wanna Be With You)

Singles
 Hide & Seek (Pak Me Dan) (6 September 2004)
 Eyahe (Ik Wil Met Jou) (12 February 2005)
 The Djumbo Jump (2 July 2005)
 Made to Love You (29 October 2005)

References

2005 albums
Djumbo albums